Ashley Creek is a stream in Dent and Texas counties in the Ozarks of southern Missouri. It is a tributary to the Current River.

The creek is formed by the joining of North Ashley Creek and South Ashley Creek.

The stream system has the name of William Henry Ashley, a frontiersman.

See also
List of rivers of Missouri

References

Rivers of Dent County, Missouri
Rivers of Texas County, Missouri
Rivers of Missouri
Tributaries of the Current River (Ozarks)